The Coca-Cola sign is an electro-kinetic sculpture on the Two Times Square building in Times Square, Manhattan, New York City.

The new sign was installed in 2017, starting with the removal of the old sign in February.  Construction of the new sign started in March, and the new sign was finished and premiered on August 8, 2017.  Guinness World Records has awarded the sign the title of the "first 3D robotic billboard".

History and design

Early signs (1920–2003)
The first Coke Times Square debuted in 1920 at 49th Street and Broadway with neon lighting being added in 1923. It flashed the words "Drink Coca-Cola, Delicious and Refreshing" and was the world's second-largest electric billboard at the time. This sign was replaced in 1932 with a new sign on 47th Street which highlighted a soda jerk, and was replaced again in the 1960s with a simpler sign that read, "The Pause That Refreshes."  By the mid 1960s, the slogan "Things Go Better With Coke" was the latest slogan on the sign.

In late October 1969, Coca-Cola embarked on a multimillion-dollar advertising campaign which at its helm was a new logo for the company, in which the trademark was housed in a square with a "dynamic ribbon" near the bottom.  A large electric sign, which alternated the new look and slogan "It's the Real Thing" in vibrant and eclectic red and white color patterns, replaced the previous one, remaining installed at Times Square for over 20 years.

The sign wouldn't be updated again until 1991, with the addition of a $3 million, neon-illuminated display, which featured a Coke bottle as the centerpiece. The Coke bottle displayed was the world's largest Coca-Cola bottle, and the sign featured both daytime and evening routines.

2004 sign
The 1991 sign was replaced in 2004 by a new Coke sign. The Coca-Cola Company and MoMA (The Museum of Modern Art) selected Brand Architecture's distinctive design from fifteen design firms from the United States.

The multi-layered billboard had a complex pattern of stainless steel planes and exposed superstructure.  The sign's design was inspired by Manhattan's steel and glass monoliths and the frenetic pace of midtown street traffic.  The three-dimensional composition rendered the Dynamic Ribbon Device in both positive form and negative space. The display also offered the possibility of live video streaming across the sign's curvature. Built by digital LED display manufacturer Daktronics and titled "Simply Coke," the sign was covered in programmable light-emitting diodes and allowed graphics to be displayed.

The sign attained 180-degree visibility by sculpting LED panels around the  horizontal thrust. Wright Massey, owner of Brand Architecture Inc. and creator of the sign, said, "We realized that a vibrant, simple design would draw focus in the frenzied pandemonium of Times Square. Drawing from recent Coca-Cola marketing research, we found the Dynamic Ribbon Device the best vehicle for conveying key brand values.  We wanted a contemporary, authentic statement, full of energy, optimism, and youthful spirit.  We wanted our sculpture to inspire consumers on all three emotional levels: head, heart and gut."

During the unveiling ceremony on July 1, 2004, which was also in the middle of an advertising campaign for Coca Cola C2, the sign showed "The Time Machine", a tribute to the past of Coca Cola and New York City, soon after activation.

2017 sign
The cubes are programmed to move in several preset configurations over the course of the day, producing different images. Some images are designed solely to elicit moods, while others communicate product names, seasonal promotions, and corporate logos in different languages. The images vary with the time of day and the season.

The sign was designed and built by Space150 and Radius Displays, with sign testing, management, and assembly by other businesses.

Gallery

See also
 Candler Building, the former Coca-Cola headquarters on 42nd Street

References

External links

Coca-Cola buildings and structures
Times Square
Billboards
Individual signs in the United States
Kinetic sculptures in the United States